Melitosaurus is an extinct genus of gavialid crocodylian discovered in Gozo, Malta in Early Miocene Aquitanian stage marine limestone rock in 1850. It is related to the extant (living) False gharial and a member of the same subfamily Tomistominae, as shown in the cladogram below:

References

Gavialidae
Prehistoric pseudosuchian genera
Fossil taxa described in 1850
Taxa named by Richard Owen